Camp Hancock near Augusta, Georgia was a military cantonment that was opened during World War I. It was named after Winfield Scott Hancock.

It included an airfield and it served as a base for a reserves unit.

It was also a divisional camp for the United States Army National Guard and a special camp for training of Army machinegun troops.

Edward Leonard King was a chief of staff there.

References

Military installations in Georgia (U.S. state)